Regis High School may refer to several schools in the United States:

 Regis High School (Iowa), located in Cedar Rapids, Iowa
 Regis High School (New York City) 
 Regis High School (Oregon), located in Stayton, Oregon
 Regis High School (Wisconsin), located in Eau Claire, Wisconsin
 Regis Jesuit High School, located in Aurora, Colorado
 The Regis School of the Sacred Heart, located in Houston, Texas